Red Bluff Flint Quarries is a historic archaeological sites located near Allendale, Allendale County, South Carolina. The site consist of two outcrops of marine chert or flint, which were heavily used by Native Americans in prehistoric times as sources of tool raw materials.

It was added to the National Register of Historic Places in 1972.

References

Quarries in the United States
Archaeological sites on the National Register of Historic Places in South Carolina
National Register of Historic Places in Allendale County, South Carolina